Setyo Budi Hartanto (also Setio Budi Hartanto; born 6 May 1986) is an Indonesian athlete who competes in long jump and high jump. He competed at the 2012 Summer Paralympic Games.

Biography
Hartanto comes from Temanggung, Central Java, and was born on 6 May, 1986. His parents are Muhtarom (father) and Muzaidah, both of whom are fishmongers. After finishing his studies at Muhammadiyah 1 Senior High School in Temanggung in 2004, he moved to the Doctor Suharto Rehabilitation Centre in Surakarta.

At the centre, a staff member named Azis suggested that Hartanto take up long jumping, a suggestion Hartanto agreed to. Hartanto competes in T10 high jump and long jump.

Hartanto received his first medal, a silver at the National Athletics Competition for the Disabled, in 2004. Hartanto was one of six athletes from Central Java who competed in the 2006 FESPIC Games. At the 2011 ASEAN Para Games in Surakarta, Hartanto received four silver medals.

In June 2012 he began training to represent Indonesia at the 2012 Summer Paralympics in London, together with two other athletics competitors, a powerlifter, a swimmer, and a table tennis player.  Hartanto was one of four Indonesian athletes at the 2012 Paralympic games, along with Ni Nengah Widiasih (powerlifting), David Jacobs (table tennis), and Agus Ngaimin (swimming). He competed in Men's Long Jump - F46 and Men's Triple Jump - F46.

References
Footnotes

Bibliography

1986 births
Indonesian long jumpers
Indonesian high jumpers
Living people
Paralympic athletes of Indonesia
Sportspeople from Central Java
Athletes (track and field) at the 2016 Summer Paralympics
FESPIC Games competitors
Medalists at the 2010 Asian Para Games
Medalists at the 2018 Asian Para Games